Saki Scheck (15 October 1925 – 8 September 2001) was a Ghanaian politician and member of the first parliament of the second republic of Ghana representing Takoradi Constituency under the membership of the Progress Party.

Early life and education
Scheck was born 15 October 1925 in the Western Region of Ghana. He obtained his Bachelor of Laws from University of Oxford and he also attended Institute of International Studies, Geneva.

Career and politics
Scheck worked as a journalist and a private legal practitioner prior to entering parliament. He was a member of the first parliament of the Second Republic of Ghana representing the Takoradi Constituency on the ticket of the Progress Party (PP). He was elected during  the 1969 Ghanaian parliamentary election and was sworn into office on 1 October 1969. He remained a member of parliament from 1969 until parliament was suspended following the overthrow of the Busia government on 13 January 1972.

Personal life and death
Scheck was a Christian. He married Laura Amorin at Sekondi, St Paul Catholic Church in 1963. Together they had five children.

Scheck died in London on 8 September 2001, at the age of 75.

See also
 Busia government
 List of MPs elected in the 1969 Ghanaian parliamentary election

References

1925 births
2001 deaths
People from Western Region (Ghana)
Alumni of the University of Oxford
Graduate Institute of International and Development Studies alumni
20th-century Ghanaian lawyers
Ghanaian MPs 1969–1972
Progress Party (Ghana) politicians
Ghanaian expatriates in the United Kingdom